Adigondanahalli is a village in the southern state of Karnataka, India.

The nearest town near this village is Attibele at a distance of around 5 km. The village is known for famous Lord Shiva Temple which was built by Pandavas.

References

External links
 http://Bangalore.nic.in/

Villages in Bangalore Urban district